Donald George Leppert (born October 19, 1931) is an American former professional baseball player and coach. 

A catcher, he appeared in Major League Baseball (MLB) from 1961 to 1964 for the Pittsburgh Pirates and Washington Senators. He was born in Indianapolis and began his 12-year active career in 1955 in the Milwaukee Braves' organization.

Playing career
During an MLB career of only 3½ years, Leppert nonetheless distinguished himself by hitting a home run on the first pitch thrown to him in the majors. On June 18, 1961,  Leppert connected in the second inning of his MLB debut against Curt Simmons of the St. Louis Cardinals; the blow gave the Pirates a 2–1 lead in a game they would eventually win, 5–3.

Almost two years later, on April 11, 1963, he hit three homers in his third game in the American League: a solo shot off Ike Delock in the fourth inning, followed by a three-run blast and another solo homer, both off relief pitcher Chet Nichols Jr., as the Senators beat the Boston Red Sox, 8–0, at DC Stadium. To top it all off, Leppert caught Tom Cheney's one-hit shutout, with the Washington pitcher striking out ten Red Sox.  

That season, Leppert was selected as a reserve on the American League All-Star team, but he did not play in the July 9 game at Cleveland Stadium.

In 190 Major League games, Leppert collected 122 hits, including 22 doubles and 15 home runs. He batted .229.

Coaching career
After his playing career ended in the minors in 1966, Leppert managed in Class A in the Pittsburgh organization in 1967. 

He then embarked upon an 18-year stint as a Major League coach for the Pirates (1968–1976), Toronto Blue Jays (1977–1979) and Houston Astros (1980–1985). 

In the late 1980s, Leppert served as field coordinator of minor league instruction for the Minnesota Twins and managed in the Twins' farm system.

Leppert also umpired a game on August 25, 1978, in Toronto during an umpires' strike. The Blue Jays' Leppert and the late Jerry Zimmerman, then the bullpen coach of the Twins, are the last two active coaches to umpire a Major League game.  

He is sometimes confused with Don Eugene Leppert, a second baseman who played one year in MLB with the 1955 Baltimore Orioles.

See also
 Home run in first Major League at-bat

References

External links

1931 births
Living people
American League All-Stars
Austin Senators players
Baseball coaches from Indiana
Baseball players from Indianapolis
Caribbean Series managers
Columbus Jets players
Corpus Christi Clippers players
Dallas Rangers players
Evansville Braves players
Hawaii Islanders players
Houston Astros coaches
Major League Baseball bullpen coaches
Major League Baseball catchers
Major League Baseball first base coaches
Minor league baseball managers
Pittsburgh Pirates coaches
Pittsburgh Pirates players
Toronto Blue Jays coaches
Washington Senators (1961–1971) players
Wichita Braves players
Alaska Goldpanners of Fairbanks players